A Man Amongst Men is the 24th and final studio album by American musician Bo Diddley and featured guest performances by Ron Wood, Keith Richards and Jimmie Vaughan. It was released on the Atlantic label in 1996. It peaked at #8 on the Billboard Top Blues Albums chart and garnered mixed reviews from critics.

Track listing

Personnel
Bo Diddley – vocals, guitar
Deb Hastings – bass
Margo Lewis – Hammond B-3 organ
Garry "Philosopher G" Mitchell – vocals
Tom Major – drums
Dave Keyes – piano, synthesizer
Nunzio Signore – guitar
Jerry Portnoy – harmonica
Richie Sambora – guitar
Dave Bronze – bass
Wayne P. Sheehy – drums
Mike Vernon – bass drum, maracas, tambourine, claves, pans, woodblock
John Rosenberg – guitar

Production
Recorded at Big House NYC
Produced by Mike Vernon
Martin Brass – engineer
Ken Feldman – assistant engineer

References

1996 albums
Bo Diddley albums
Albums produced by Mike Vernon (record producer)
Atlantic Records albums